Kastel-Staadt is a municipality in the Trier-Saarburg district, in Rhineland-Palatinate, Germany.

History
From 18 July 1946 to 6 June 1947 Kastel-Staad, in its then municipal boundary, formed part of the Saar Protectorate.

References

Trier-Saarburg